The Kapi was a Spanish automobile manufactured by Automóviles y Autoscooter Kapi in Barcelona from 1950 until 1955.  Designed by Captain Federico Saldaña, the first car was a light three-wheeled two door runabout powered by a 125 cc 2 cv single-cylinder two-stroke engine made by Montessa. The single wheel was at the front.

Other models followed including:

the Kapiscooter with Hispano-Villiers engine
the Jip, a miniature Jeep with 197 cc engine
the Chiqui, a three-wheeler with single wheel at the rear
the Platillo Volante (flying saucer), a four-wheel coupé
the M190 with miniature Mercedes 190 body

References
The Jip
The Platillo Volante
David Burgess Wise, The New Illustrated Encyclopedia of Automobiles

Defunct motor vehicle manufacturers of Spain
Three-wheeled motor vehicles
Companies based in Barcelona